Wilful Peggy is a 1910 American silent film directed by D. W. Griffith and starring Mary Pickford.

Plot
Peggy is a feisty peasant girl who catches the eye of a wealthy lord. Enamored with her, he proposes, but she harshly refuses. Her mother pushes her into the marriage against her will. After their marriage, she makes a fool of herself among the socialites at her husband's party. In the height of her embarrassment, her husband's nephew convinces her to run away with him. She innocently agrees, but it soon becomes obvious what the nephew's true intentions were.

Cast
Mary Pickford as Peggy
Clara T. Bracy as Peggy's mother
Henry B. Walthall as the Lord

References

External links

1910 films
American black-and-white films
1910 comedy films
Films directed by D. W. Griffith
Biograph Company films
American silent short films
Silent American comedy films
1910s American films